Texas Longhorns basketball may refer to:
Texas Longhorns men's basketball
Texas Longhorns women's basketball